Two Moons (1847–1917) was a Cheyenne chief.

Two Moons may also refer to:

 Two Moons (collage), a 2010 public artwork by India Cruse-Griffin, in Indianapolis, Indiana, US
 Two Moons (film), a 1920 American silent Western film
 "Two Moons", a 2012 song by Exo-K and Exo-M from Mama
 Two Moons, a 2000 piano composition by Ivan Fedele
 Two Moons, a 2000 novel by Thomas Mallon
 The Two Moons, a 2006 omnibus edition of the first two Giants novels by James P. Hogan

See also
 Walk Two Moons, a 1994 novel by Sharon Creech
 Moons of Mars, Phobos and Deimos, the two moons of the planet Mars